The 2010 McDonald's Burnie International was a professional tennis tournament played on outdoor hard courts. It was the 8th edition of the tournament, and part of the 2010 ATP Challenger Tour and 2010 ITF Women's Circuit. It took place in Burnie, Australia, between 1 and 7 February 2010.

Main draw singles entrants

Seeds

 Rankings are as of 18 January 2010

Other entrants
The following players received wildcards into the singles main draw:
  Dayne Kelly
  James Lemke
  Matt Reid
  Luke Saville

The following players received entry from the qualifying draw:
  Joshua Crowe
  Nima Roshan
  Bernard Tomic
  Kittipong Wachiramanowong

Champions

Singles

 Bernard Tomic def.  Greg Jones, 6–4, 6–2

Doubles

 Matthew Ebden /  Samuel Groth def.  James Lemke /  Dane Propoggia, 6–7(8–10), 7–6(7–4), [10–8]

Women's singles

 Arina Rodionova def.  Jarmila Groth 6–1, 6–0

Women's doubles

 Jessica Moore /  Arina Rodionova def.  Tímea Babos /  Anna Arina Marenko 6–2 6–4

External links

McDonald's Burnie International
Mcd
Burnie International
February 2010 sports events in Canada